Bruno Betti (31 May 1911 – 2 November 1986) was an Italian long-distance runner who competed at the 1936 Summer Olympics.

References

External links
 

1911 births
1986 deaths
People from Borgo San Lorenzo
Athletes (track and field) at the 1936 Summer Olympics
Italian male long-distance runners
Italian male steeplechase runners
Olympic athletes of Italy
Sportspeople from the Metropolitan City of Florence